Mark Henry Heathcote Partridge (23 November 1922 – 13 December 2007) was a Rhodesian politician who served as the minister of Lands and Natural Resources  and Defence.

Early life
Partridge was born on 23 November 1922, at States Mines, East Rand, Transvaal, in South Africa. A year later his family moved to Salisbury in Southern Rhodesia, and Patridge was later educated at St. George's College. He enlisted in the King’s Royal Rifle Corps in 1940, seeing service in the Mediterranean theatre. In 1944 he received a temporary commission as an officer in the KRRC. Following demobilisation in 1945, Partridge became a company director.

Political career
After joining the Rhodesian Front party, Partridge stood as the RF candidate for the Southern Rhodesian Legislative Assembly seat of Greendale in the December 1962 assembly election. He subsequently gained 55% of the vote, defeating Herbert Jack Quinton of the United Federal Party. He was re-elected for Greendale in 1965 and at the House of Assembly elections in 1970 (72%), 1974 (70.2%) and 1977 (79.3%). 

In 1966 he was made Minister of Local Government and Housing by Prime Minister Ian Smith, and was made Minister of Lands and Natural Resources in May 1973. On 10 March 1977, he was briefly appointed as Minister of Defence, before being appointed as Minister of Agriculture and Water Development until the end of Rhodesia on 1 June 1979. In the only election for the House of Assembly of Zimbabwe Rhodesia held in April 1979, Partridge was elected unopposed as the member for Highlands but did not hold office in the government.

Following Zimbabwe's formal independence and first elections in 1980, Partridge was elected to the indirectly-elected Senate of Zimbabwe. With the Rhodesian Front becoming the Conservative Alliance of Zimbabwe from 1984, he moved from the Senate to the House of Assembly from the 1985 election as the MP for Mazowe-Mutoko, serving until the abolition of the White roll seats in 1987.

References

Rhodesian people of British descent
Alumni of St. George's College, Harare
King's Royal Rifle Corps officers
Southern Rhodesian military personnel of World War II
British Army personnel of World War II
White Rhodesian people
White Zimbabwean politicians
Rhodesian politicians
1922 births
2007 deaths
Rhodesian Front politicians
Members of the Legislative Assembly of Southern Rhodesia
Members of the Parliament of Rhodesia
Members of the Senate of Zimbabwe
Members of the National Assembly of Zimbabwe
20th-century Zimbabwean politicians
South African emigrants to Rhodesia
Defence Ministers of Zimbabwe